is a junction passenger railway station located in the city of Toba, Mie Prefecture. Japan. It is jointly operated by Central Japan Railway Company (JR Central) and the private railway operator Kintetsu Railway.

Lines
Toba Station is served by the JR Sangū Line and is 29.1 rail kilometers from the terminus at the Taki Station. It is also served by the Kintetsu Toba Line and Shima Line, and is located 41.5 rail kilometers from the terminus of that line at Ise-Nakagawa Station.

Station layout
The station consists of two bay platforms for JR Central, only one of which is in use, and two island platforms for use by the Kintetsu Lines. Then JR portion of the station is staffed.

Platforms

Adjacent stations

History 

Toba Station opened on July 21, 1911 as a station on the Japanese Government Railways (JGR) Sangū Line. The Shima Electric Railway connected to the station on July 23, 1929. JGR became the Japanese National Railways (JNR) after World War II. Through a series of mergers, the Shima Electric Railway became the part of the Kintetsu Group by April 1, 1965. The Kintetsu portion of the station was rebuilt in March 1970. The JNR portion of the station burned down in a fire on January 6, 1974 and rebuilt by October 14, 1975. The Kintetsu portion of the station was rebuilt again on July 23, 1999.

Passenger statistics
In fiscal 2019, the JR portion of the station was used by an average of 318 passengers daily (boarding passengers only), whereas the Kintetsu portion of the station was used by 1728 passengers daily.

Surrounding area
Mikimoto Pearl Island
Toba Aquarium
Toba Port and ferries to outlying islands
Toba International Hotel

See also
List of railway stations in Japan

References

External links

 JR Central: Toba Station 
 Kintetsu: Toba Station 
 Kintetsu: Layout of Toba Station

Stations of Kintetsu Railway
Railway stations in Mie Prefecture
Railway stations in Japan opened in 1911
Toba, Mie